ONE Friday Fights 8: Petsukumvit vs. Petchmuangsri (also known as ONE Lumpinee 8) was a combat sport event produced by ONE Championship that took place on March 10, 2023, at Lumpinee Boxing Stadium in Bangkok, Thailand.

Background
The event was headlined by a flyweight muay thai bout between Petsukumvit Boibangna vs. Petchmuangsri Tded99, and headlining the international portion of the bill, former ONE Bantamweight Kickboxing World Champion Alaverdi Ramazanov will battle Uzbekistani standout Mavlud Tupiev in a bantamweight muay thai bout.

Results

Bonus awards 
The following fighters received $10,000 bonuses.

Performance of the Night: Petsukumvit Boibangna, Petlampun Muadablampang, Numsurin Chor.Ketwina, Banluerit Or.Atchariya, Maisangkum Sor. Yingcharoenkarnchang and Jomhod AutoMuayThai

See also 

 2023 in ONE Championship
 List of ONE Championship events
 List of current ONE fighters

References 

Events in Bangkok
ONE Championship events
2023 in mixed martial arts
Mixed martial arts in Thailand
Sports competitions in Thailand
March 2023 sports events in Thailand